Juan Doyle Vaca Mendoza (born 8 October 1979 in Santa Cruz de la Sierra) is a Bolivian retired football defender.

National team
Vaca made his debut for the Bolivia national team on October 7, 2001 in a World Cup qualifying match against Ecuador, as a 32nd-minute substitute for Sergio Rogelio Castillo. Since then he has scored once for the national squad.

International goals
Scores and results list Bolivia's goal tally first.

References

External links

1979 births
Living people
Sportspeople from Santa Cruz de la Sierra
Bolivian footballers
Bolivia international footballers
The Strongest players
Club Bolívar players
Club San José players
Oriente Petrolero players
Guabirá players
Association football defenders